Pan is a 1510s bronze sculpture by Andrea Riccio. It is in the collection of the Metropolitan Museum of Art.

Description and interpretation
The work depicts Pan. One art critic stated a belief that the drawings of Bernardo Parentino were a particular inspiration for this work.

Later history and influence
Art historians have debated the creator of this work. Wilhelm von Bode was the first to propose that Riccio created this Pan and Leo Planiscig, expert on North Italian bronzes, stated agreement.

References

1510s sculptures
Bronze sculptures
Created via preloaddraft
Sculptures of Pan (god)
Sculptures of the Metropolitan Museum of Art
Renaissance sculptures